Divya Rana is a former Bollywood actress most noted for her role in Raj Kapoor's Ram Teri Ganga Maili. Divya began her career with the film Ek Jaan Hain Hum (1983) opposite Raj Kapoor's youngest son Rajiv Kapoor. Then she was selected as the second lead in Raj Kapoor's Ram Teri Ganga Maili (1985) co-starring Rajiv Kapoor & Mandakini. Divya later acted in films like Watan Ke Rakhwale, Ek Hi Maqsad, Aasmaan (1984), Maa Kasam (1985 film), Param Dharam and many others. She quit her acting career after her marriage and lives in Mumbai with her husband Fazal and goes by the name Salma Manekia.  She works as a photographer and makes ceramic sculptures.

Selected filmography

References

External links

Indian film actresses
Living people
Year of birth missing (living people)
Indian actresses